"Pissed Me Off" is a song by American rapper Lil Durk. It was released on October 15, 2021, with an accompanying music video. It is the lead single from his seventh studio album 7220.

Content
Jessica McKinney of Complex described the song as "hard-hitting and aggressive" and about Lil Durk rapping about "street activity, weapons, and more". Durk begins the song with a tribute to his deceased brother D-Thang. In his verse, he mentions a home invasion in July 2021 and how he and his girlfriend India Royale exchanged gunfire with the intruders. He pays tribute to rapper King Von, his close friend who was killed in November 2020.

Charts

Certifications

References

2021 singles
2021 songs
Lil Durk songs
Songs written by Lil Durk